SAIC Volkswagen Automotive Co., Ltd., formerly known as Shanghai Volkswagen Automotive Co., Ltd. is an automobile manufacturing company headquartered in Anting, Shanghai, China and a joint venture between Volkswagen Group and SAIC Motor. It was founded in 1984 and produces cars under the Volkswagen, Škoda and Audi marques. It is the second automobile manufacturing joint venture in China after American Motors and the first German car manufacturer to enter China.

The joint venture is made up of equity from Volkswagen AG (40%), Volkswagen (China) Invest (10%), SAIC Motor (50%), with a fixed-term venture for 45 years. It will run until 2030.

SAIC Volkswagen sold a total of 1.16 million vehicles in 2011.

History
The joint venture was formed in October 1984, as Shanghai Volkswagen. This was a 25-year contract to make passenger cars in Shanghai with a limit of 50 percent foreign ownership. Shanghai Volkswagen began automobile production in 1985. As car imports fell to some 34,000 in 1990, SAIC Volkswagen's production of its Santana models reached nearly 19,000 vehicles that year. By 1993 SAIC Volkswagen's output had reached 100,000 vehicles.

Volkswagen was aided by some Shanghai municipal efforts. Various restrictions on engine size, as well as incentives to city taxi companies, helped ensure a safe market in the company's relatively wealthy home arena. The Shanghai plant was by far the winner among all new JVs, as it produced cars that could function as taxis, vehicles for government officials and transport for the newly emerging business elite. Volkswagen also encouraged its foreign parts suppliers to create joint ventures in China, and their resulting product helped SAIC Volkswagen achieve an 85 per cent local content rate by 1993.

On 12 April 2002, SAIC Motor renewed its contract with Volkswagen and extended the term of cooperation for another 20 years. Chinese Communist Party former general secretary Jiang Zemin attended the signature ceremony. Shanghai Volkswagen Sales Co. Ltd, established on 19 October 2000, as the first joint venture in vehicle sales in China.

On 11 April 2005, the Czech automotive brand Škoda Auto was introduced after signing a contract. The first model for the brand was the Škoda Octavia built by Shanghai Volkswagen and commenced production on June 6, 2007. This followed with the Škoda Fabia in December 2008, the Superb in August 2009, the Škoda Rapid in April 2013 and the long wheelbase Škoda Yeti seven months later. To complete the model lineup for the Chinese market, the Škoda Kodiaq was officially listed in March 2017, followed by the Škoda Karoq in January 2018 and the Chinese built Škoda Kamiq five months later.

SAIC Volkswagen started vehicle export shipments in January 2018 which targets left-hand drive Southeast Asian markets. Prior to this, the company briefly exported several hundred Volkswagen Polo Sedan to Australia in 2004.

Facilities

Current products (Audi)

Current products (Škoda)

Current products (Volkswagen)

Sales

See also 

 FAW-Volkswagen
 Volkswagen Group China
 SAIC Motor
 SAIC-GM

References

External links
 

Car manufacturers of China
Volkswagen
Volkswagen Group
Vehicle manufacturing companies established in 1984
Chinese companies established in 1984
Chinese-foreign joint-venture companies